Federal Route 117, or Jalan Pantai Tengah, is a major federal road in Langkawi Island, Kedah, Malaysia.

Features

At most sections, the Federal Route 117 was built under the JKR R5 road standard, with a speed limit of 90 km/h.

List of junctions and town

References

Malaysian Federal Roads
Roads in Langkawi